Saïd Haddou (born 23 November 1982 in Issy-les-Moulineaux) is a French professional road bicycle racer, who last rode for UCI Professional Continental team .

Major Victories
In 2007, and 2009, he won Tro-Bro Léon.

Brother
He is the brother of Nahir Haddou, who is also a cyclist.

Competition Results

2004
 1st La Côte Picarde
 1st Stage 4 Boucles de la Mayenne
2005
 1st Stage 4 Tour de Gironde
 7th GP de Denain
2006
 1st Stage 1 Tour du Poitou-Charentes
2007
 1st Tro-Bro Léon
 2nd Boucles de l'Aulne
 4th GP de Denain
 5th Paris–Bourges
2009
 1st Tro-Bro Léon
2011
 1st Stage 5 Étoile de Bessèges
 5th Châteauroux Classic
2012
 1st Tallinn–Tartu GP
 10th Tour de Vendée

Grand Tour general classification results timeline

External links 
Profile Bouygues Télécom at official website

1982 births
Living people
People from Issy-les-Moulineaux
French sportspeople of Algerian descent
French male cyclists
Sportspeople from Hauts-de-Seine
Cyclists from Île-de-France